German submarine U-653 was a Type VIIC U-boat built for Nazi Germany's Kriegsmarine for service during World War II.
She was laid down on 9 April 1940 by Howaldtswerke, Hamburg as yard number 802, launched on 22 March 1941 and commissioned on 25 May 1941 under Kapitänleutnant Gerhard Feiler.

Design
German Type VIIC submarines were preceded by the shorter Type VIIB submarines. U-653 had a displacement of  when at the surface and  while submerged. She had two shafts and two  propellers.

U-653 was fitted with five  torpedo tubes (four fitted at the bow and one at the stern), fourteen torpedoes, one  SK C/35 naval gun, 220 rounds, and a  C/30 anti-aircraft gun. The boat had a complement of between forty-four and sixty.

Service history
The boat's career began with training at 1st U-boat Flotilla on 25 May 1941, followed by active service on 1 December 1941 as part of the 1st Flotilla for the remainder of her service.

Convoy ON 166

U-653 fired seven torpedoes at, and missed, the British freighter Delilian, but succeeded in striking the 9,382-GRT Dutch motor vessel Madoera. Against the odds, Madoera stayed afloat and reached St. John's seven days later, but not before some of her crew had abandoned ship and made for the lifeboats.

Fate
All hands were lost.

Wolfpacks
U-653 took part in 16 wolfpacks, namely:
 Pfadfinder (21 – 27 May 1942)
 Blücher (14 – 18 August 1942)
 Natter (2 – 8 November 1942)
 Westwall (8 November – 16 December 1942)
 Hartherz (3 – 7 February 1943)
 Ritter (11 – 26 February 1943)
 Burggraf (4 – 5 March 1943)
 Raubgraf (7 – 15 March 1943)
 Coronel (4 – 8 December 1943)
 Coronel 1 (8 – 14 December 1943)
 Coronel 2 (14 – 17 December 1943)
 Föhr (18 – 23 December 1943)
 Rügen 6 (23 – 28 December 1943)
 Rügen 7 (28 December 1943 – 2 January 1944)
 Rügen 6 (2 – 5 January 1944)
 Preussen (4 – 15 March 1944)

Summary of raiding history

References

Notes

Citations

Bibliography

External links

German Type VIIC submarines
1941 ships
U-boats commissioned in 1941
Ships lost with all hands
U-boats sunk in 1944
U-boats sunk by depth charges
U-boats sunk by British warships
World War II shipwrecks in the Atlantic Ocean
World War II submarines of Germany
Ships built in Hamburg
Maritime incidents in March 1944